Lieutenant-General Sir Frederick Arthur Willis  (16 July 1827 – 28 May 1899) was a British Army General who held high office in the 1880s.

Military career
Willis was commissioned into the 70th Regiment of Foot in 1844.

In 1881, he was invited to command an Infantry Brigade at Aldershot and then in 1884 he was appointed General Officer Commanding Northern District. He remained in this post until 1886.

He was awarded the colonelcy of the Northumberland Fusiliers from 1895 to his death in 1899.

He was made KCB posthumously in the 1899 Birthday Honours, which were announced days after his death.

References

 

|-
 

1827 births
1899 deaths
Military personnel from London
British Army lieutenant generals
Knights Commander of the Order of the Bath
East Surrey Regiment officers
People from Kensington